Alexander Brodie may refer to:
 Sir Alexander Brodie, Lord Brodie (1617–1680) of Brodie, member of the Parliament of Scotland for Elginshire 1643–50
 Alexander Brodie (died 1672) of Lethen, member of the Parliament of Scotland for Nairnshire 1646–9
 Alexander Brodie (1697–1754) of Brodie, Lord Lyon King of Arms and a Member of the Parliament of Great Britain 1720–54 for Elginshire, Caithness and Inverness
 Alexander Brodie (died 1770) of Lethen, member of parliament for Nairnshire 1735–41
 Alexander Brodie (1748–1812), member of parliament for Nairnshire 1785–90 and Elgin Burghs 1790–1802
 Alexander Brodie (sculptor) (1829/30–1867), Scottish sculptor, younger brother of William Brodie
 Alexander Oswald Brodie (1849–1918), US soldier and Governor of Arizona Territory 1902–5
 John Alexander Brodie (1858–1934), civil engineer and town planner
 Several members of Clan Brodie

See also
 Alexander Broadie (born 1942), Scottish historian of philosophy
 Alexander Brody (disambiguation)